Phosphorus pentabromide is a reactive, yellow solid of formula PBr5, which has the structure PBr4+ Br− in the solid state but in the vapor phase is completely dissociated to PBr3 and Br2. Rapid cooling of this phase to 15 K leads to formation of the ionic species phosphorus heptabromide ([PBr4]+[Br3]−).

It can be used in organic chemistry to convert carboxylic acids to acyl bromides. It is highly corrosive. It decomposes above 100 °C to give phosphorus tribromide and bromine:

PBr5  →  PBr3  +  Br2

Reversing this equilibrium to generate PBr5 by addition of Br2 to PBr3 is difficult in practice because the product is susceptible to further addition to yield phosphorus heptabromide (PBr7).

References 

Phosphorus bromides
Phosphorus(V) compounds